Mechanical Love is a 2007 documentary by Danish filmmaker Phie Ambo about Hiroshi Ishiguro and his work on robots that resemble humans (gynoids and androids).

References

External links

Mechanical Love at Icarus Films

Documentary films about robots
2007 films
Danish documentary films
Films shot in Japan
2007 documentary films